The New Guinea scrubfowl or New Guinea megapode (Megapodius decollatus) is a species of bird in the family Megapodiidae. It is found in New Guinea, mostly in the northern half. Its natural habitats are subtropical or tropical moist lowland forest and subtropical or tropical moist montane forest. This species was formerly known as Megapodius affinis but Roselaar, 1994, Bulletin of the Zoological Museum of the University of Amsterdam, 14, no.2, pp. 9–36 showed that Megapodius affinis A.B.Meyer, 1874 refers to M. reinwardt.

References

New Guinea scrubfowl
Birds of New Guinea
New Guinea scrubfowl
Taxonomy articles created by Polbot